Montfort School, Anakkara is the first Montfortian School in Kerala started in June 1995. Montfort Brothers have been working in India for over 100 years. A good number of these Brothers hail from Kerala.

Location
Montfort School is located 15 km from Thekkady, the renowned wildlife destination and spice village.

History
After the division of the Southern Province of the Montfort Brothers in 1993, the Brothers of the Yercaud Province were eagerly looking for a place on the High Range of Kerala to establish a good English Medium School. Rev. Fr. Mathew Nellary who was the Director of Malanadu Development Society based at Anakkara in Idukki District had a great desire to see a good school at Anakkara. So he wrote to some religious congregations asking them to start a school at that place.

He wrote a letter on the 1st October 1993 to Bro. Antony Francisco who was the director of Montfort School, Yercaud. Since a positive reply came from Yercaud, Rev. Fr. Mathew Nellary went to Yercaud to meet the concerned people and to discuss matters about starting of a school here. Thus it was decided to look for a suitable place for the school in the Anakkara Parish. Fr. George Kottadikunnel who was the then Parish Priest of Anakkara Forane Church was very happy about the prospect and promised all help for the commencement of the school.

Motto
The school motto is "Truth Triumphs", i.e. may truth prevail in the efforts of the teachers and in their thoughts as they pursue good moral and intellectual formations besides physical and spiritual development.

Emblem
The emblem expresses the school's vision and objectives. The book and the lamp signify learning for enlightenment. The cross symbolizes sacrifice and that the school is based on Christian Principles. The flame signifies Truth, Commitment and Justice in the efforts of the staff and students towards the attainment of their goals.

The palm trees are emblems of the Eastern World, and in particular they symbolize the native flora of Kerala State . The letters D and S are an abbreviation of the motto of the Montfort Brothers Dieu Seul, which translated means "God Alone".

Reference

External links
 Official website
 Montfort School, Yercaud

Brothers of Christian Instruction of St Gabriel schools
Christian schools in Kerala
Schools in Idukki district